Dolours Price (16 December 1950 – 23 January 2013) was a Provisional Irish Republican Army (IRA) volunteer.

Early life
Dolours and her sister, Marian, also an IRA member, were the daughters of Albert Price, a prominent Irish republican and former IRA member from Belfast. Their aunt, Bridie Dolan, was blinded and lost both hands in an accident handling IRA explosives.

Paramilitary activity
Price became involved in Irish republicanism in the late 1960s and she and her sister Marian participated in the Belfast to Derry civil rights march in January 1969 and were attacked in the Burntollet Bridge incident.

In 1971, together with Marian, she joined the Provisional Irish Republican Army (IRA). In 1972 she joined an elite group within the IRA called "The Unknowns" commanded by Pat McClure. The Unknowns were tasked with various secretive activities and transported several accused traitors across the border into the Republic of Ireland where they were "disappeared". She personally stated that she had driven Joe Lynskey across the border to face trial. In addition she stated that she, Pat McClure, and a third Unknown were tasked with killing Jean McConville, with the third Unknown actually shooting her.

She led the car bombing attacks in London on 8 March 1973, which injured over 200 people and is believed to have contributed to the death of one person who suffered a fatal heart attack. The two sisters were arrested, along with Gerry Kelly, Hugh Feeney, and six others on the day of the bombing as they were boarding a flight to Ireland. They were tried and convicted at the Great Hall in Winchester Castle on 14 November 1973. Although originally sentenced to life imprisonment, which was to run concurrently for each criminal charge, their sentence was eventually reduced to 20 years. Price served seven years for her part in the bombing. She immediately went on a hunger strike demanding to be moved to a prison in Northern Ireland. The hunger strike lasted for 208 days because the hunger strikers were force-fed by prison authorities to keep them alive.

On the back of the hunger-striking campaign, her father contested West Belfast at the UK General Election of February 1974, receiving 5,662 votes (11.9%). The Price sisters, Gerry Kelly, and Hugh Feeney were moved to Northern Ireland prisons in 1975 as a result of an IRA truce. In 1980 Price received the Royal Prerogative of Mercy, and was freed on humanitarian grounds in 1981, purportedly suffering from anorexia nervosa due to the invasive trauma of daily force feedings.

The Price sisters remained active politically. In the late 1990s, Price and her sister claimed that they had been threatened by their former colleagues in the IRA and Sinn Féin for publicly opposing the Good Friday Agreement (i.e. the cessation of the IRA's military campaign). Price was a contributor to The Blanket, an online journal, edited by former Provisional IRA member Anthony McIntyre, until it ceased publication in 2008.

Personal life
After her release in 1980, she married Irish actor Stephen Rea, with whom she had two sons, Danny and Oscar. They divorced in 2003.

Later life
In 2001, Price was arrested in Dublin and charged with possession of stolen prescription pads and forged prescriptions. She pleaded guilty and was fined £200 and ordered to attend Alcoholics Anonymous meetings.

In February 2010, it was reported by The Irish News that Price had offered help to the Independent Commission for the Location of Victims' Remains in locating graves of three men, Joe Lynskey, Seamus Wright, and Kevin McKee. The bodies of Seamus Wright and Kevin McKee were recovered from a singular grave in County Meath in August 2015. It is unclear if Price played a role in their recovery. The remains of Joe Lynskey have not been recovered as of September 2022. 

She was the subject of the 2018 feature-length documentary I, Dolours in which she gave an extensive filmed interview.

Allegations against Gerry Adams
In 2010 Price claimed Gerry Adams had been her officer commanding when she was active in the IRA. Adams, who has always denied being a member of the IRA, denied her allegation. Price admitted taking part in the murder of Jean McConville, as part of an IRA action in 1972. She claimed the murder of McConville, a mother of 10, was ordered by Adams when he was an IRA leader in West Belfast. Adams further denied Price's allegations, stating that the reason for them was that she was opposed to the IRA's abandonment of paramilitary warfare in favour of politics in 1994, in the facilitation of which Adams had been a key figure.

Boston College tapes
Oral historians at Boston College interviewed both Dolours Price and her fellow IRA paramilitary Brendan Hughes between 2001 and 2006. The two giving detailed interviews for the historical record of the activities in the IRA, which were recorded on condition that the content of the interviews was not to be released during their lifetimes. Prior to Price's death, in May 2011, the Police Service of Northern Ireland (PSNI) subpoenaed the material, possibly as part of an investigation into the disappearance of a number of people in Northern Ireland during the 1970s. In June 2011, the college filed a motion to quash the subpoena. A spokesman for the college stated that "our position is that the premature release of the tapes could threaten the safety of the participants, the enterprise of oral history, and the ongoing peace and reconciliation process in Northern Ireland." In June 2011, US federal prosecutors asked a judge to require the college to release the tapes to comply with treaty obligations with the United Kingdom. On 6 July 2012, the United States Court of Appeals for the First Circuit agreed with the government's position that the subpoena should stand. On 17 October 2012, the United States Supreme Court temporarily blocked the college from handing over the interview tapes. In January 2013 Price died, and in April 2013, the Supreme Court turned away an appeal that sought to keep the interviews from being supplied to the PSNI. The order left in place a lower court ruling that ordered Boston College to give the Justice Department portions of recorded interviews with Dolours Price. Federal officials wanted to forward the recordings to police investigating the murder of Jean McConville.

Death
On 24 January 2013 Price was found dead at her Malahide, County Dublin home, from a toxic effect of mixing prescribed sedative and anti-depressant medication. The inquest returned a verdict of death by misadventure.
Her body was buried at Milltown Cemetery in West Belfast.

References

Further reading
 Keefe, Patrick Radden. Say Nothing: A True Story of Murder and Memory in Northern Ireland. New York: Doubleday, 2019. 
 Clutterbuck, Richard. Kidnap and Ransom. Boston: Faber & Faber, 1978.

External links
 Suzanne Breen interviews Marian Price
  Source material (2000 Electronic Telegraph article)
 On This Day: 1973: IRA gang convicted of London bombings, BBC
 The Blanket
 Dolours Price Archive

1950 births
2013 deaths
Paramilitaries from Belfast
Provisional Irish Republican Army members
Recipients of British royal pardons
Republicans imprisoned during the Northern Ireland conflict
People from Malahide
Accidental deaths in the Republic of Ireland